Vincenzo (Enzo) Zadel is a Croatia-born Yugoslav retired football player.

Career
Born in Rijeka, as a player he spent eight seasons with his hometown club, HNK Rijeka, where he was the club's top scorer for two seasons. He then moved on to FK Sloboda Tuzla, where he played for two seasons, scoring 41 goals. In 1966 he moved to Turkey and later to Switzerland where he finished his career at age 39.

Honours
NK Rijeka
Yugoslav Second League: 1957-58

References

1937 births
Living people
Footballers from Rijeka
Association football midfielders
Yugoslav footballers
HNK Rijeka players
FK Sloboda Tuzla players
Göztepe S.K. footballers
Yugoslav First League players
Yugoslav Second League players
Yugoslav expatriate footballers
Expatriate footballers in Turkey
Yugoslav expatriate sportspeople in Turkey